A pebble is a small clast of rock.

Pebble may also refer to:

Places

Falkland Islands
Pebble Island
Pebble Island Settlement

United States
Pebble, Nebraska, ghost town
Pebble Beach, California
Pebble Township (disambiguation), two places in the United States
 Pebble Mine, a mineral exploration project in the Bristol Bay region of Southwest Alaska

People

Fictional characters
 Pearl Pebble, mother of animated character Wilma Flintstone
 Wilma Pebble, birth name of animated character Wilma Flintstone

Other uses
 Pebble (watch), a smartwatch for iPhone and Android

See also

Pebbles (disambiguation)
Motorola PEBL, a cell phone (mobile phone)